Tiliacea citrago, the orange sallow, is a species of moth of the family Noctuidae. It is found in Europe as far east as the Caucasus Mountains and the Urals.

Technical description and variation

The wingspan is 28–33 mm. Forewing yellow, thickly freckled with orange; veins finely ferruginous; lines ferruginous brown, the median thick; all running more or less parallel to each other and to termen; the inner oblique outwards from costa to subcostal vein and again from vein 1 to inner margin where it touches the median; stigmata of the ground colour, with brown rings; the orbicular large, round; both with brown centres; submarginal line formed of disconnected pale lunules edged inwardly with darker; hindwing pale yellow;- aurantiago Tutt is a darker form, deeper orange, and sometimes darkened by grey dusting, occurring in Britain: incolorata equally meriting a distinctive name is a rare form, ab. incolorata ab. nov. [Warren] in which the ground colour is pure pale ochreous, without any orange freckling, the veins and lines faintly brownish, the stigmata all but obsolete; the fringe pale; hindwing white; I have seen only 1 example, a female, certainly British, but without exact locality; the form subflava Ev., from Denmark, the Baltic, St. Fetersburg, and the Ural Mts.; recorded also from Asia Minor, has quite a different appearance, the 3 lines, inner, outer, and submarginal being accompanied by brown bands of uniform width, the stigmata marked with brown, and the hindwing with brown veins and terminal border.

Biology

The moth flies from August to October depending on the location.

Larva grey brown with a pink tinge; dorsal and subdorsal lines whitish; between them a black spot surrounded with white tubercles on each segment; spiracular stripe yellowish white, broad.
The larvae feed on the leaf-buds and later the leaves of Tilia species, including Tilia cordata and Tilia platyphylla.

References

External links

Orange sallow on UKmoths
Lepiforum.de
Vlindernet.nl 

Cuculliinae
Moths described in 1758
Moths of Europe
Taxa named by Carl Linnaeus